The Hubbard House is a historic house in Nashville, Tennessee, U.S.. It was built in 1921 by architecture firm McKissack and McKissack for Dr. George W. Hubbard, the then-president of Meharry Medical College, an African-American medical school. It was built on its original campus, and its construction was funded by trustees and alumni. 

It has been listed on the National Register of Historic Places since August 14, 1973.

References

Houses on the National Register of Historic Places in Tennessee
Houses completed in 1921
Houses in Nashville, Tennessee